Patrik Mišák (born 29 March 1991) is a Slovak footballer who plays as a midfielder for Wieczysta Kraków.

International career
Mišák was called up for two unofficial friendly fixtures held in Abu Dhabi, UAE, in January 2017, against Uganda (1–3 loss) and Sweden. He made his debut against Sweden playing the second half of the match, when he substituted Filip Hlohovský. Slovakia lost the game 0–6.

References

External links
 
 AS Trenčín profile
 

1991 births
Living people
Slovak footballers
Association football forwards
AS Trenčín players
FC Baník Ostrava players
FK Bohemians Prague (Střížkov) players
AFC Nové Mesto nad Váhom players
Bruk-Bet Termalica Nieciecza players
Mezőkövesdi SE footballers
Zagłębie Sosnowiec players
Wieczysta Kraków players
Ekstraklasa players
Slovak Super Liga players
I liga players
Nemzeti Bajnokság I players
Czech First League players
Czech National Football League players
Sportspeople from Trenčín
Expatriate footballers in the Czech Republic
Expatriate footballers in Poland
Expatriate footballers in Hungary
Slovak expatriate sportspeople in Poland
Slovak expatriate sportspeople in Hungary
Slovak expatriate sportspeople in the Czech Republic